Gilford Hicks "Gil" Martin Jr. is an American NASCAR crew chief. He is currently employed at Richard Childress Racing as the Competition Director of the NASCAR Xfinity Series Shop, formerly the owner of FILMAR Racing and the crew chief for the No. 29 Sprint Cup Series car, driven by Kevin Harvick. He is the first crew chief to win in all three divisions of Cup, Nationwide, and Truck Series. He has over 20 NASCAR Sprint Cup Series wins (counting non-points races) and one of the most successful crew chiefs in NASCAR over all three series. He is married to wife Ronda and has one son, Ford Martin.

References

External links
 

1960 births
Living people
NASCAR crew chiefs